In the Heart of Everyone is a compilation album released by  Orange Music containing select songs taken from Bradley Joseph's previously released One Deep Breath, Solo Journey, The Journey Continues, and Hear the Masses. It is distributed throughout Singapore, Hong Kong, Malaysia, Taiwan, Thailand, and Indonesia.   In a review by Yeoh Wee Teck of In the Heart of Everyone, he remarked "Instead of attempting to fuse elements of different cultures like everyone else, he chose to rely on what he knows best - simple arrangements with assured piano playing."

Track listing
"A Light From Home"
"Yesterday is But a Dream"
"A Summer's Story"
"A Warm Breeze"
"The Poetry Room"
"Away From the World"
"Winter Moon"
"My Friend"
"Letting Go"
"An Ocean Above"
"The Long Last Mile"
"In Peace"
BONUS TRACKS:
13. "The Road Ahead"
14. "Wind Farmer" (Piano Version) 
15. "In The Heart of Everyone"

Personnel
All music composed, produced, and performed by Bradley Joseph.

References

External links
Official Website
In the Heart of Everyone at Orange Music
In the Heart of Everyone at Discogs

Bradley Joseph albums
2004 compilation albums
Instrumental compilation albums